William Anane (born 17 November 1979 in Ghana) is a Ghanaian retired footballer who last played for SKV Beienheim.

Career
Anane started his senior career with FV Bad Vilbel. In 2005, he signed for Senec in the Slovak Super Liga, where he scored four goals.

References

External links
 William, German footballer in Vietnam
 William the globetrotter 
 A lottery win for Hanoi
 Interview with William Anane

Association football forwards
Living people
Rot-Weiss Frankfurt players
Ghanaian footballers
1979 births